Note: This ship should not be confused with USS Dawn (SP-37), a yawl ordered delivered to the United States Navy in 1917 but never commissioned into service.

The second USS Dawn (SP-26) was a motorboat that served in the United States Navy as a repair boat from 1917 to 1918.

Dawn was built in 1914 by Hehre and Aker at Clason Point in The Bronx, New York, as a private motorboat of the same name. The U.S. Navy acquired her from her owner, W. T. Donnelley of Brooklyn, New York, on 19 June 1917 for World War I service as a repair boat, deeming her electric-drive propulsion plant suitable for furnishing electric power for lighting, machine shop work, or repairs. She was commissioned as USS Dawn (SP-26) on 19 June 1917, the day of her acquisition from Donnelley.

Dawn was assigned to the 2nd Naval District. Apparently she did not prove satisfactory in service, for a January 1918 U.S. Navy note commented that the Navy had decided to return her to her owner.

The Navy returned Dawn to Donnelley on 4 April 1918.

References

Department of the Navy: Naval Historical Center: Online Library of Selected Images: Civilian Ships: Dawn (American Motor Boat, 1914). Served as USS Dawn (SP-26) in 1917-1918
NavSource Online: Section Patrol Craft Photo Archive Dawn (SP 26)

World War I auxiliary ships of the United States
Ships built in the Bronx
1914 ships